Nikolay Nikolaevich Kozlov (born 21 July 1972) is a retired Russian water polo player. He competed at the 1992, 1996, 2000 and 2004 Olympics and won one silver and two bronze medals.

See also
 Russia men's Olympic water polo team records and statistics
 List of Olympic medalists in water polo (men)
 List of players who have appeared in multiple men's Olympic water polo tournaments
 List of World Aquatics Championships medalists in water polo

External links
 

1972 births
Living people
People from Moscow Oblast
Russian male water polo players
Olympic water polo players of the Unified Team
Olympic water polo players of Russia
Water polo players at the 1992 Summer Olympics
Water polo players at the 1996 Summer Olympics
Water polo players at the 2000 Summer Olympics
Water polo players at the 2004 Summer Olympics
Olympic silver medalists for Russia
Olympic bronze medalists for the Unified Team
Olympic bronze medalists for Russia
Olympic medalists in water polo
Medalists at the 2004 Summer Olympics
Medalists at the 2000 Summer Olympics
Medalists at the 1992 Summer Olympics
World Aquatics Championships medalists in water polo
Sportspeople from Moscow Oblast